Philippe of Dammartin (Philippa de Dammartin) was a 13th-century noble woman. Philippe was the daughter of Simon of Dammartin, Count of Aumâle and his wife Marie of Ponthieu. She was the sister of Joan, Countess of Ponthieu, wife of Ferdinand III of Castile and mother of Eleanor of Castile, the wife of Edward I of England.

Philippe married three times.
1. Her first marriage was to Raoul II of Lusignan in ca 1239/40. Philippe was his third wife. They had no children, but she was the stepmother of Marie de Lusignan.
2. Her second marriage was to Raoul II, Lord of Coucy in ca. 1246. They had one child:
 Enguerrand de Coucy, died young (before 1250).
3. Her third marriage was to Otto II, Count of Guelders between 1252 and 1254. They had four children:
 Reginald I, Count of Guelders.
 Philippa of Guelders, who married Waleran II, Lord of Valkenburg.
 Margaret of Guelders, who married Dietrich VII, Count of Cleves.
 Maria of Guelders.

References

Sources

French countesses
13th-century French women
13th-century French people
House of Dammartin
House of Lusignan
House of Wassenberg
Date of birth unknown
Date of death unknown